Stangholmen Lighthouse is a coastal lighthouse in the municipality of Risør in Agder county, Norway. The lighthouse marks the channel from the Skaggerak, through several islands to the mainland town of Risør which sits at the end of a peninsula between the Søndeledfjorden and the Sandnesfjorden. The lighthouse was first built in 1855 and in 1959, a new, automated light was constructed which is still in use to this day. The light is located on the small island of Stangholmen. It is only accessible by boat. The site is open to the public but the buildings are not.

The white, cylindrical concrete tower has a red roof on top. The light emits a white, red, or green light (depending on direction) occulting once every 6 seconds. Each light can only be seen from certain directions.

History
The first lighthouse at Stangholmen was built in 1855. The lighthouse was closed in 1959 when the long-time keeper retired. The present, automated light was constructed next to the old light and it began operation when the old tower closed. The old keeper's house is now owned by the municipality and it is used as a restaurant in the summers by reservation only.

Media gallery

See also
Lighthouses in Norway
List of lighthouses in Norway

References

Lighthouses in Agder
Risør